Golovin may refer to:

 Golovin (crater), a lunar impact crater on the far side of the Moon
 Golovin (surname), people with the surname Golovin or Golovina
 Golovin, Alaska, a US city
 Golovin Airport

See also
Maria Golovin, an opera by Gian Carlo Menotti
Rustavelis Gamziri (formerly known as Golovin Street), an avenue in central Tbilisi, Georgia
Golovino (disambiguation)
Golovinsky (disambiguation)